The Montsoreau Flea Market is the largest flea market in the Loire Valley, taking place all year the second Sunday of the month. Montsoreau is a small city named after the mount Soreau on which is built the famous château de Montsoreau, the only château of the Loire Valley to have been built in the Loire riverbed. Montsoreau is listed among the most beautiful villages of France, and both the village and the château are part of the UNESCO listed world heritage site of the Loire valley. The Montsoreau Flea Market includes all year, a hundred professional merchants and is located in the vieux port district, on the banks of the Loire river.

History 
Montsoreau is a listed UNESCO World Heritage Site located in the Loire Valley, and is also listed among the Most Beautiful Villages of France. The flea market of Montsoreau was created in April 1990 by the municipality of Montsoreau in order to develop the commerce and tourism of this small city, and to take full advantage of the city scenery. The city of Montsoreau relied on a local network of antique dealers to define the periodicity (once a month, the second Sunday), and the identity of the event.

France-Europe Antiques Quality Label 
The Montsoreau flea market has received in 2006 the France-Europe Antiques Quality Label, and is one of the 52 events labeled in Europe. This label is issued by the SNCAO-GA (National Trade Union of Antiquity, Modern and Contemporary Art Galleries) and deposited at the INPI (National Institute of Intellectual Property) ) and WIPO (World Intellectual Property Organization) in Geneva.

Attendance 
In 2011, attendance was between 6,000 and 10,000 visitors per event, to today regularly exceed 10,000 visitors.

Le plus des puces 
Twenty arts and crafts professionals gathered to offer their services during the Montsoreau flea market. These professionals are able to restore objects sold by antique dealers, but also to offer their creations or custom projects. They affect all areas dedicated to arts and crafts, and are specialized in restoration, interior design, or decoration.

See also 
 Châteaux of the Loire Valley
 Loire Valley (wine)

References

External links 
  Montsoreau Flea Market official

Montsoreau
Tourist attractions in France
Tourist attractions in Montsoreau
Flea markets